Mizraab is a progressive rock and metal band from Karachi, Sindh, Pakistan, formed in 1997. Founded by vocalist, lead guitarist and songwriter, Faraz Anwar, the band's initial line-up was with Faraz Anwar on vocals, Khalid Khan on bass and Akhtar Qayyum on percussions, since then there had been many changes in the line-up the only consistent member being Faraz himself. The band have been influential on many contemporary musical artists, and have gained a large cult following despite garnering little radio or music video airplay.

The band is well known for being one of the few bands to have brought progressive rock music in Pakistan, thus being one of the few heavy metal music bands to receive significant acknowledgment by the press. The band earned a growing fan base in the underground music community and critical acclaim, with their debut album release Panchi in 1999 described as the first progressive rock album in Pakistan. Faraz Anwar then in 2001 recorded and released An Abstract Point of View through the record label Gnarly Geezer, owned by Allan Holdsworth. The album got rave reviews from musicians all over the world hailing Faraz as a great guitar find from Asia. In 2004, the band, fronted by Faraz, found renewed success and popularity by the release of their second studio album, Maazi, Haal, Mustaqbil, which received critical acclaim. The album sold more than 30,000 copies and is the band's highest selling album. Singles from the album like "Panchi" and "Kitni Sadian" received a lot of airtime on local music channels. The album is also credited to be the first proper Urdu metal album released in Pakistan.

After the release of their second studio album, Mizraab made a comeback into the lime light with the video for "Ujalon Main" in December 2006, which showcased the new band members as well as the change in genre and was well received all over the country. Mizraab's third album was completed in late 2006–2007 but due to the dire state of the music industry in Pakistan, no deal could be reached and the album was shelved.

History

Early years (1996)
Faraz Anwar started out as a session player working for many major artists around the country, which included the likes of Sajjad Ali, Vital Signs, Junoon, Nusrat Fateh Ali Khan, Ali Haider and Nadeem Jafri. In 1996, Faraz, while studying at Berklee College of Music, Boston, Massachusetts, was awarded an educational scholarship and an outstanding musical achievement award but he was unable to proceed his education due to personal hurdles. Faraz then returned to Pakistan and took charge of the band Collage and went on releasing the band's debut album Gul Jana which was highly acclaimed and did very well at the local music charts. However, after going on tour to England, Collage disbanded and Faraz went on forming his own band. First, he recruited Khalid Khan on bass guitar, also a band member of Collage and then Akhtar Qayyum on percussion.

Formation (1997–2001)

Mizraab was formed in Karachi, Sindh, in 1997 by vocalist, lead guitarist and songwriter Faraz Anwar, who then recruited Akhtar Qayyum on percussions and Khalid Khan on bass guitar. The name of the band was given by Faraz's father, the word being Persian for a piece of metal worn on the finger while playing sitar. The trio then after a struggle of two years went on recording and releasing the band's debut album, Panchi, in April 1999. The album included fast tempos, instrumentals, and aggressive musicianship that placed them as one of the pioneers of progressive metal music in Pakistan. The release of the album also earned the band a growing fan base in the underground music community and critical acclaim and thus the album was regarded as the first progressive rock album in the country.

Although initially, the album was not meant for release and Faraz did not want it to be more than an experiment. "The album was good but I felt strongly about re-doing it. Not revamping but redoing it," he says. However, Akhtar Qayyum went on to strike a record deal with Sound Master and the album was released in 1999. "I had no idea that Akhtar would go out and release it, which he did. It did well but I wasn't expecting the album to hit the market," says Faraz. This led to relations between Akhtar and Faraz restrain and Akhtar soon left the band due to musical differences.

Faraz then, keeping the name of Mizraab, began his solo project. In the summers of 1999, he went on recording his solo album at Digital Fidelity Studios in Lahore, Punjab, where his work was well received. Faraz then recorded and released his instrumental solo album, An Abstract Point of View, through the American-based record label Gnarly Geezer Records, owned by Allan Holdsworth, in 2001. It is only the second guitar-based instrumental album to have been produced in Pakistan. The album got rave reviews from musicians all over the world hailing Faraz as a great guitar find from Asia. On the other hand, Faraz also continued performing for the death metal band called Dusk, which included famous musician and director Babar Sheikh, and released its debut album My Infinite Nature Alone.

Ushering a new revival (2002–2005)
After Akhtar Qayyum left the band, Faraz Anwar recruited two new members Jamal Mustafa on rhythm guitars and Irfan Ahmed on drums. The band then started working on their second studio album. Firstly, the band struggled to strike a record deal as no record label was willing to release a progressive rock album as the general Pakistani audience were not aware of the genre. Leaving aside the record labels, the band also faced opposition from the local music channels as they banned the band from playing their music videos which were initially given a lot of air time. Music videos of singles "Insaan", released in October 2002, and "Meri Terhan", released in December, were banned from playing on many local music channels.

However, the band did not gave up and went on recording and releasing their third single music video, "Izhar", for the 2003 Cricket World Cup and dedicated the song to the Pakistan cricket team. The video of the song was made in a very short period of time and was released in March 2003. The video was a success and received a lot of air time play on music channels and was even played internationally on the Dubai based sports channel Ten Sports. Due to the success of the single, "Izhar" was nominated for the "Best Rock Song" and "Best Alternative Track" award at the Indus Music Awards 2003. After the release of "Izhar", Khalid Khan also left the band due to playing bass for two bands at one time, Mizraab and Aaroh. Aaroh had already broken into the mainstream and Mizraab was not going to remain underground much longer. Realizing that it was difficult for him to continue with both these demanding acts, the band decided that Khalid should limit himself to one of these. So, Khalid ended up parting ways with the band and became a full-time band member of Aaroh. Faraz Arshad, an ex-student of Faraz Awar, replaced Khalid Khan on bass guitars. And following the success of Faraz Anwar's solo album, his side-project, Dusk went on to release their second studio album Jahilia by a Czech label known as Epidemie Records later that year.

On 14 April 2004, Mizraab released their fourth single "Kitni Sadian" music video directed by Babar Sheikh from their upcoming second studio album. On 8 March, Mizraab released their second studio album Maazi, Haal, Mustaqbil, which found the band renewed popularity and success. The album was released by the record label, Sadaf Stereo and was quickly sold out in the market. The album received to much criticism and critical acclaim by critics. The album also featured the two new recruits in the band, Jamal Mustafa and Faraz Arshad. The album was released after 3 years of struggle because no record label was interested in releasing a progressive rock format album in Pakistan. However, the album sold more than 30,000 copies upon release and the album sales surprised the record label and was forced to print out more copies because of its demand. Maazi Haal Mustaqbil is credited to be the first proper Urdu metal album released and the first ever progressive concept album released in Pakistan. Due to the success of the album, at the Lux Style Awards 2004, the album was nominated for the "Best Music Album" award. On 13 August, Mizraab paid tribute to the most successful pop band of Pakistan, Vital Signs, by covering a heavy metal music version of the famous patriotic song "Dil Dil Pakistan". On 13 October, Mizraab performed live at The Geo Applause at National Sailing Club in Karachi.

In 2005, Faraz Anwar culminated in Dusk's first international tour of fifteen performances in two straight weeks. On 20 May, Mizraab performed at the music festival "Carnival de Rock" held at Karachi Arts Council. On 30 April, Mizraab were nominated for the "Best Alternative Track" award for "Kitne Sadian" at the Indus Music Awards. On 25 May, Mizraab performed at a concert in the capital city, Islamabad held in City School. On 11 June, Faraz Anwar along with many well known local musicians like John Louis "Gumby" Pinto, Khurram Waqar and many more gave a Guitar Workshop. On 13 September, Mizraab released its fifth single "Panchi" music video directed by Murtaza Chaudry from their second studio album. The band then went on giving an interview at local music channel like Play TV. In October, Mizraab released the music video of the single "Meré Khuda" dedicating the song to the 2005 Kashmir earthquake victims. In November 2005, the documentary Faraz Anwar - Documentary was released on Mizraab's musical journey directed and produced by Haroon Sheikh.

Struggle (2006–2009)

In 2006, Mizraab made their debut concert in Lahore by performing at the Rock Festival on 13 January. On 25 March, Mizraab performed at the Maritime museum in Karachi. In July, Mizraab appeared on The Musik at the show Rock On. After the release of their second studio album, Mizraab made a comeback into the lime light with the music video for "Ujalon Main" in December 2006, which showcased the new band members as well as the change in genre. It received a lot of positive feedback from fans and critics alike.

On 16 January 2007, Mizraab performed at the Aag Alive concert held in Karachi. On 22 April, the band went on performing at the Institute of Business Administration, Karachi. On 5 August, Mizraab's single "Insaan" was at number No. 1 for the download of the week by Instep magazine. On 11 August, Mizraab performed a live jam on MTV Pakistan. On 24 August, Mizraab performed live on the television show Playin' It Live at Play TV. In December, Mizraab released their second single "Woh Aur Main" from the band's upcoming third studio album. The video was directed by band members Irfan Ahmed and Faraz Anwar themselves and topped several music charts.

Mizraab's third album was completed in late 2006–2007 but due to the dire state of the music industry in Pakistan, no deal could be reached and the album was shelved. In 2008, "Ujalon Main" directed by Soheb Akhtar was nominated for the "Best Music Video" award at the Lux Style Awards. In February 2009, Mizraab made their comeback into the music scene by performing a gig live at T2P. On 14 February, Faraz Anwar gave a guitar workshop at Lahore University of Management Sciences. Faraz Anwar then went on taking part in the Guitar Idol with his instrumental "Autumn Madness" and made it to the final round of the competition. But unfortunately Faraz had to pull out of the competition due to not having a UK visa to travel to the country where the final took place. In late 2009, Faraz Anwar decided to head to England to pursue his own personal interests.

Change and new line-up (2010–2012)
On 1 January 2010, Mizraab released a live album Mizraab - Live & Rare from their live performances on MTV Pakistan. Upon going to England, Faraz Anwar recruited new members to Mizraab; James Hobday took over on bass guitars, Yusuke Iwahashi on rhythm guitars and Matthew Curr on drums. On 6 February, Faraz Anwar and Irfan Ahmed were invited as guests at the television programme The Azfar Mani Show on Aag TV where Faraz Anwar discussed about the future of his band, Mizraab and the band's upcoming third studio album, which will be released soon when the country's political situation will be better. On 20 April, Faraz Anwar, on his return to Pakistan from England, performed a few songs for Mizraab fans which included singles like "Woh Aur Main", "Meri Terhan" and "Kitni Sadian". On 17 October, Mizraab performed at the Indus Valley School of Art and Architecture with a new line-up which included Faraz on vocals and session musicians, Omran Shafique on rhythm guitar, John Louis Pinto on drums and Mannu on bass.

In 2011, after completing a music production and jazz guitar course in England, Anwar returned to Pakistan and auditioned new members for Mizraab. On 19 March 2011, Mizraab performed live at National University of Computer and Emerging Sciences in Karachi. On 1 April, Mizraab performed their first ever unplugged performance at the MTV Unplugged live sessions with a new line-up; Irfan Ahmed on drums, Muhammad Muzzamil on rhythm and Ferdinand Goveas on bass, held at V-Sel Outlet in Karachi. On 11 May, it was confirmed that Mizraab will be performing at Coke Studio season four, which will be aired on 22 May, through a Coke Studio television promo of the first episode. On 14 May, in a behind the scenes video of Mizraab performing at a Coke Studio session, Faraz Anwar discussed about performing a middle eastern classical track "Kuch Hai" at Coke Studio. On 22 May, Mizraab performed "Kuch Hai", from Maazi, Haal, Mustaqbil, featuring Mannan Ali Khan, adding Eastern classical infusion of vocals into the band's signature rock sound, with backing vocals by Zoe Viccaji and Rachel Viccaji at Coke Studio fourth season first episode. On 24 May, in a review of the Coke Studio fourth season, first episode, The Express Tribune newspaper gave the song a 9/10 rating claiming it to be the best performance of the first episode. On 31 May, Mizraab were interviewed at Hum TV programme, Morning with Hum hosted by Noor Bukhari, where the band discussed about their musical journey and talked about their upcoming third studio album. On 29 October, Mizraab performed at the Hamdard University Dental Hospital in Karachi. On 2 December, Mizraab released their single "Tu Kareeb Hai" from their third album, Ujalon Main.

On 21 January 2012, Mizraab released an unplugged live album, Unplugged. On 31 May, Faraz Anwar through his Facebook page asked for fans opinion that whether they would prefer a new Mizraab album or a solo instrumental album by Faraz, himself. The response to this was critically acclaim as the comments by majority of the fans were in favour of a Mizraab album rather than a solo effort. On 31 December 2012, Mizraab released the music video of their single "Tu Kareeb Hai" directed by Yousuf Arain.

Hiatus (2013–present)
Faraz Anwar confirmed through his official Facebook page that Mizraab would be taking a break due to consistent changes in the band's line-up. On 1 February 2013, Mizraab released a live album Aag Alive which was recorded back in 2007 for Aag TV's "Aag Alive" show. This was one of the major performances by Mizraab recorded for television.

Music

Language
From their debut album Panchi to their second studio album Maazi, Haal, Mustaqbil, all songs are written by the band in Urdu language. Mostly, all lyrical content on their debut album is written by percussionist and lyricist Akhtar Qayyum, while songs on the band's second album are written by writer Adnan Ahmed and lead vocalist Faraz Anwar. Lyrically, Mizraab's music contains references to life, death, nature, the environment a person lives in and are based on worldly issues.

Influence

Faraz Anwar, lead vocalist and guitarist of the band, says that he gets most of his inspiration for Mizraab's songs from Rush, Dio and Yngwie Malmsteen music. Songs like "Muntazir" and "Kuch Hai", (from Maazi, Haal, Mustaqbil) and "Kahani" and "Panchi" (from Panchi) are some examples of this influence. Other songs, such as "Sari Shamain" have elements of neo-classical metal and some others, like "Izhar", from the album Maazi, Haal, Mustaqbil, and Ujalon Main" and "Woh Aur Main", from the band's upcoming third album, have elements of pop rock. Bands stated as influence include Rush, Dio, Iron Maiden, America and Kansas.

The band paid tribute to the Pakistani pop band Vital Signs by covering a heavy metal version of their famous single "Dil Dil Pakistan". The band also released a music video for the song produced by Indus Music on 13 August 2004.

Musical style

Mizraab is well noted for being one of the early progenitors of the progressive metal genre in Pakistan. The founder, vocalist, lead guitarist and songwriter, Faraz Anwar has strong influences from bands such as Rush, America, Iron Maiden, Kansas and Dio. The band sound is aimed to combine distorted guitars and fast riffing, but the music is focused more on technical proficiency and precise execution than on heavy metal riffs. Mizraab's music has also been compared by some critics with the likes of Dream Theater.

Mizraab's debut album Panchi (1999) has a blend of western music with classical eastern music. Lyrically, their music contains references to life, death, nature, the environment a person lives in and are based on worldly issues. Songs like "Insaan", "Meri Terhan", "Sari Shamain" and "Sham-o-Seher" are examples. The band's second studio album Maazi, Haal, Mustaqbil (2004) featured elements of heavy metal and classical music. Songs like "Panchi", "Kitni Sadian", "Kuch Hai" and "Muntazir" are examples.

Awards and nominations

Mizraab have only received two nominations at the Lux Style Awards for the "Best Music Album" award in 2004 and the "Best Music Video" award for "Ujalon Main" in 2008. Mizraab has also been nominated at the Indus Music Awards several times and have received four nominations in total at the awards. Overall, Mizraab have received six nominations but have not won any award.

Discography

Studio albums
Panchi (1999)
Maazi, Haal, Mustaqbil (2004)
Ujalon Mein (2009)

Band members

Current members
Faraz Anwar – lead vocals, lead guitar (1997–present)
Irfan Ahmad – drums (2002–2010, 2011–present)
Muhammad Muzammil – rhythm guitar, backing vocals (2011–present)
Ferdinand Goveas  – bass (2011–present)

Former members
Akhtar Qayyum – percussion (1997–1999)
Khalid Khan – bass, backing vocals (1997–2003)
Faraz Arshad – bass, backing vocals (2003–2005)
Jamal Mustafa – rhythm guitar (1999–2004)
Shahzad Naseem – rhythm guitar, backing vocals (2004–2009)
Rahail Siddiqui – bass, backing vocals (2005–2009)
James Hobday – bass (2010–2011)
Matthew Curr – drums (2010–2011)
Yusuke Iwahashi – rhythm guitar (2010–2011)
Sabih Uddin – rhythm guitar (2012–2014)

Timeline

See also 
 List of Pakistani music bands

References

External links
Official website 
Mizraab at MySpace
Mizraab at Facebook
Mizraab at Twitter

 
Musical groups established in 1997
Musical quartets
Pakistani heavy metal musical groups
Musical groups from Karachi
Pakistani progressive rock groups
Progressive metal musical groups